This article details statistics relating to the Kansas City Chiefs National Football League (NFL) American football team, including career, single season and games records.

Offense

Passing
Most pass attempts, career: Len Dawson, 3,696
Most pass attempts, season: Patrick Mahomes, 658 (2021)
Most pass attempts, rookie season: Steve Fuller, 270 (1979)
Most pass attempts, game: Patrick Mahomes, 68 (2022)
Most pass completions, career: Len Dawson, 2,115
Most pass completions, season: Patrick Mahomes, 436 (2021)
Most pass completions, rookie season: Steve Fuller, 146 (1979)
Most pass completions, game: Patrick Mahomes, 43 (2022)
Highest completion percentage, career (min. 500 attempts): Patrick Mahomes, 66.5  
Highest completion percentage, season (min. 200 attempts): Alex Smith, 67.5 (2017)
Highest completion percentage, rookie season (min. 200 attempts): Steve Fuller, 54.1 (1979)
Highest completion percentage, game (min. 15 attempts): Len Dawson, 89.5 (1967)
Most passing yards, career: Len Dawson, 28,507 
Most passing yards, season: Patrick Mahomes, 5,250 (2022) 
Most passing yards, rookie season: Steve Fuller, 1,484 (1979) 
Most passing yards, game: Elvis Grbac, 504 (2000) 
Highest yards per attempt, career (min. 500 attempts): Patrick Mahomes, 8.1
Highest yards per attempt, season (min. 200 attempts): Len Dawson, 9.42 (1968) 
Highest yards per attempt, rookie season (min. 200 attempts): Steve Fuller, 5.5 (1979) 
Highest yards per attempt, game (min. 15 attempts): Len Dawson, 18.5 (1963) 
Most passing touchdowns, career: Len Dawson, 237
Most passing touchdowns, season: Patrick Mahomes, 50 (2018)
Most passing touchdowns, rookie season: Steve Fuller, 6 (1979)
Most passing touchdowns, game: Len Dawson, 6 (1964); Patrick Mahomes, 6 (2018 (twice))
Most passes intercepted, career: Len Dawson, 178
Most passes intercepted, season: Trent Green, 24 (2001)
Most passes intercepted, rookie season: Steve Fuller, 14 (1979)
Most passes intercepted, game: Todd Blackledge, 6 (1985)
Lowest percentage passes had intercepted, career (min. 500 attempts): Alex Smith, 1.4
Lowest percentage passes had intercepted, season (min. 200 attempts): Damon Huard, 0.41 (2006) 
Lowest percentage passes had intercepted, rookie season (min. 200 attempts): Steve Fuller, 5.2 (1979)
Highest passer rating, career (min. 500 attempts): Patrick Mahomes, 105.7
Highest passer rating, season (min. 200 attempts): Patrick Mahomes, 113.8 (2018)
Highest passer rating, rookie season (min. 200 attempts): Steve Fuller, 55.8 (1979)
Highest passer rating, game (min. 10 attempts): Len Dawson, 158.3 (1963); Trent Green, 158.3 (2003); Alex Smith, 158.3 (2013)
Most games, 300+ passing yards, career: Patrick Mahomes, 41
Most games, 350+ passing yards, career: Patrick Mahomes, 21
Most games, 400+ passing yards, career: Patrick Mahomes, 9
Most games, 300+ passing yards, season: Patrick Mahomes, 10 (2018, 2022)
Most games, 350+ passing yards, season: Trent Green, 5 (2004); Patrick Mahomes, 5 (2018, 2020)
Most games, 400+ passing yards, season: Patrick Mahomes, 2 (2019, 2020, 2021, 2022)
Most games, 1+ passing TD's, career: Len Dawson, 116
Most games, 2+ passing TD's, career: Len Dawson, 70
Most games, 3+ passing TD's, career: Len Dawson, 38
Most games, 4+ passing TD's, career: Patrick Mahomes, 16
Most games, 5+ passing TD's, career: Patrick Mahomes, 6
Most games, 6+ passing TD's, career: Patrick Mahomes, 2
Most games, 1+ passing TD's, season: Patrick Mahomes, 17 (2022)
Most games, 2+ passing TD's, season: Patrick Mahomes, 14 (2018)
Most games, 3+ passing TD's, season: Patrick Mahomes, 10 (2018)
Most games, 4+ passing TD's, season: Patrick Mahomes, 7 (2018)
Most games, 5+ passing TD's, season: Patrick Mahomes, 2 (2018, 2021)
Most games, 6+ passing TD's, season: Patrick Mahomes, 2 (2018)

Receiving

Most receiving touchdowns, career: Tony Gonzalez, 76
Most receiving touchdowns, season: Dwayne Bowe, 15 (2010), Tyreek Hill, 15 (2020)
Most receiving touchdowns, rookie season: Marc Boerigter, 8 (2002)
Most receiving touchdowns, game: Frank Jackson, 4 (1964); Jamaal Charles, 4 (2013); Travis Kelce, 4 (2022)
Most pass receptions, career: Tony Gonzalez, 916
Most pass receptions, season: Tyreek Hill, 111 (2021)
Most pass receptions, rookie season: Dwayne Bowe, 70 (2007)
Most pass receptions, game: Tony Gonzalez, 14 (2005)
Most receiving yards, career: Tony Gonzalez, 10,940
Most receiving yards, season: Tyreek Hill, 1,479 (2018)
Most receiving yards, rookie season: Dwayne Bowe, 995 (2007)
Most receiving yards, game: Stephone Paige, 309 (1985)
Most games, 100+ receiving yards, career: Travis Kelce, 35
Most games, 100+ receiving yards, season: 6 (five players), most recently Travis Kelce (2020)
Most consecutive games with a reception: Travis Kelce, 132
Highest yard average per reception, career (min. 200 attempts): Carlos Carson, 18.1
Highest yard average per reception, season (min. 50 attempts): Otis Taylor, 22.4 (1966)
Highest yard average per reception, rookie season (min. 50 attempts): Dwayne Bowe, 14.2 (2007)
Highest yard average per reception, game (min. 3 attempts): Curtis McClinton, 42.6 (1965)

Rushing

Most rushing touchdowns, career: Priest Holmes, 76
Most rushing touchdowns, season: Priest Holmes, 27 (2003) (tied 2nd NFL record)
Most rushing touchdowns, rookie season: Billy Jackson, 10 (1981)
Most rushing touchdowns, game: 4 (three players), most recently Priest Holmes and Derrick Blaylock (2004)
Most rushing attempts, career: Larry Johnson, 1,375
Most rushing attempts, season: Larry Johnson, 416 (2006)
Most rushing attempts, rookie season: Joe Delaney, 234 (1981)
Most rushing attempts, game: Larry Johnson, 39 (2006)
Most rushing yards, career: Jamaal Charles, 7,260 
Most rushing yards, season: Larry Johnson, 1,789 (2006)
Most rushing yards, rookie season: Kareem Hunt, 1,327 (2017)
Most rushing yards, game: Jamaal Charles, 259 (2010)
Most games, 100+ rushing yards, career: Larry Johnson, 30
Most games, 100+ rushing yards, season: Larry Johnson, 11 (2006)
Highest yard rushing average, career (min. 400 attempts): Jamaal Charles, 5.5
Highest yard rushing average, season (min. 100 attempts): Jamaal Charles, 6.4 (2010)
Highest yard rushing average, rookie season (min. 100 attempts): Abner Haynes, 5.6 (1960)
Highest yard rushing average, game (min. 10 attempts): Abner Haynes, 14.3 (1960)

Combined (rushing and receiving) 

Most yards from scrimmage, career: Tony Gonzalez, 10,954
Most yards from scrimmage, season: Priest Holmes, 2,287 (2002)
Most yards from scrimmage, rookie season: Kareem Hunt, 1,782 (2017)
Most yards from scrimmage, game: Stephone Paige, 309 (1985)
Most yards from scrimmage, rookie game: Kareem Hunt, 246 (2017)
Most total touchdowns, career: Priest Holmes, 83
Most total touchdowns, season: Priest Holmes, 27 (2003) 
Most total touchdowns, rookie season: Abner Haynes, 12 (1960); Tyreek Hill, 12 (2016)
Most total touchdowns, game: Abner Haynes, 5 (1961); Jamaal Charles, 5 (2013)

Defense

Most solo tackles, career: Derrick Johnson, 941
Most solo tackles, season: Donnie Edwards, 114 (2000)
Most solo tackles, rookie season: Kevin Ross, 98 (1984)
Most solo tackles, game: Eric Berry, 14 (2014)
Most sacks, career: Derrick Thomas, 126.5
Most sacks, season: Justin Houston, 22.0 (2014) (tied 2nd NFL record)
Most sacks, rookie season: Derrick Thomas, 10.0 (1989)
Most sacks, game: Derrick Thomas, 7.0 (1990)
Most interceptions, career: Emmitt Thomas, 58
Most interceptions, season: Emmitt Thomas, 12 (1974)
Most interceptions, rookie season: Bobby Hunt, 8 (1962); Marcus Peters, 8 (2015)
Most interceptions, game: 4 (three players), most recently Deron Cherry (1985)
Most interceptions returned for touchdown, career: Bobby Bell, 6
Most interceptions returned for touchdown, season: Jim Kearney, 4 (1972)
Most interceptions returned for touchdown, rookie season: Dave Webster, 2 (1960); Marcus Peters, 2 (2015)
Most interceptions returned for touchdown, game: 2 (three players), most recently Derrick Johnson (2010)
Most interception yards returned, career: Emmitt Thomas, 937
Most interception yards returned, season: Mark McMillian, 274 (1997)
Most interception yards returned, rookie season: Dave Webster, 156 (1960)
Most fumbles, career: Len Dawson, 81
Most fumbles, season: Steve Fuller, 16 (1980)
Most fumbles, rookie season: Abner Haynes, 9 (1960); Joe Delaney, 9 (1981)
Most forced fumbles, career: Derrick Thomas, 41
Most forced fumbles, season: Derrick Thomas, 8 (1992)
Most forced fumbles, rookie season: Tamba Hali, 5 (2006)
Most fumbles return for touchdown, career: Derrick Thomas, 4
Most fumbles return for touchdown, season: Tim Gray, 2
Most passes defended, career: Brandon Flowers, 92
Most passes defended, season: Marcus Peters, 26 (2015)
Most passes defended, rookie season: Marcus Peters, 26 (2015)

Special teams

Kicking

Most field goals attempted, career: Jan Stenerud, 436
Most field goals attempted, season: Jan Stenerud, 44 (1971)
Most field goals attempted, rookie season: Harrison Butker, 42 (2017)
Most field goals attempted, game: Jan Stenerud, 7 (1971); Cairo Santos, 7 (2015)
Most field goals made, career: Nick Lowery, 329
Most field goals made, season: Harrison Butker, 38 (2017)
Most field goals made, rookie season: Harrison Butker, 38 (2017) (NFL record)
Most field goals made, game: Cairo Santos, 7 (2015)
Highest field goal percentage, career (min. 100 attempts): Harrison Butker, 89.9
Highest field goal percentage, season (min. 20 attempts): Pete Stoyanovich, 96.3 (1997)
Highest field goal percentage, rookie season (min. 20 attempts): Harrison Butker, 90.5 (2017)
Most field goals made, 50+ yards, career: Nick Lowery, 20
Most field goals made, 50+ yards, season: 6 Harrison Butker (2021)
Most field goals made, 50+ yards, game: 3 (five players), most recently Harrison Butker (2020)
Most extra points attempted, career: Nick Lowery, 483
Most extra points attempted, season: Harrison Butker, 69 (2019)
Most extra points attempted, rookie season: Lawrence Tynes, 60 (2004)
Most extra points attempted, game: 8 (four players), most recently Ryan Succop (2013)
Most extra points made, career: Nick Lowery, 479
Most extra points made, season: Harrison Butker, 65 (2018)
Most extra points made, rookie season: Lawrence Tynes, 58 (2004)
Most extra points made, game: 8 (four players), most recently Ryan Succop (2013)
Highest extra point percentage, career (min. 100 attempts): Tommy Brooker, 100.0; Ryan Succop, 100.0
Longest Field Goal, Harrison Butker, 62 yards (2022)

Punting

Most punts, career: Dustin Colquitt, 1124
Most punts, season: Daniel Pope, 101 (1999)
Most punts, rookie season: Daniel Pope, 101 (1999)
Highest punt yard average, career (min. 100 punts): Dustin Colquitt, 44.8
Highest punt yard average, season (min. 50 punts): Dustin Colquitt, 46.8 (2012)
Highest punt yard average, rookie season (min. 50 punts): Bob Grupp, 43.6 (1979)
Most punts had blocked, career: Jerrel Wilson, 12
Most punts had blocked, season: 2 (three players), most recently Daniel Pope (1999)
Longest punt: Dustin Colquitt, 81 yards (2007)

Return

Longest kick return, career: Knile Davis, 108 (2013) (tied 2nd NFL record)
Most kick return yards, career: Dante Hall, 10,526
Most kick return yards, season: Dante Hall, 1,950 (2003–2004)
Most kick return yards, rookie season: Tamarick Vanover, 1,635 (1995)
Most kick return yards, game: Jon Vaughn, 251 (1994)
Most kickoff returns, career: Dante Hall, 360
Most kickoff returns, season: Dante Hall, 68 (2004)
Most kickoff returns, rookie season: Tamarick Vanover, 43 (1995)
Most kickoff return yards gained, career: Dante Hall, 8,644
Most kickoff return yards gained, season: Dante Hall, 1,718 (2004)
Most kickoff return yards gained, rookie season: Noland Smith, 1,148 (1967)
Most kickoff returns yards gained, game: Jon Vaughn, 251 (1994)
Highest kickoff return average, career (min. 50 kickoff returns): Knile Davis, 27.8
Highest kickoff return average, season (min. 25 kickoff returns): Quintin Demps, 30.1 (2013)
Highest kickoff return average, rookie season (min. 25 kickoff returns): Noland Smith, 28.0 (1967)
Most kickoff returns for touchdown, career: Dante Hall, 6
Most kickoff returns for touchdown, season: 2 (three players), most recently Dante Hall (2004)
Most kickoff returns for touchdown, rookie season: Paul Palmer, 2 (1987); Tamarick Vanover, 2 (1995)
Most punt returns, career: J.T. Smith, 216
Most punt returns, season: J. T. Smith (American football), 58 (1979); Dexter McCluster, 58 (2013)
Most punt returns, rookie season: Tamarick Vanover, 51 (1995)
Most punt return yards gained, career: J.T. Smith, 2,289
Most punt return yards gained, season: Dexter McCluster, 686 (2013)
Most punt return yards gained, rookie season: Tamarick Vanover, 540 (1995)
Most punt return yards gained, game: Dexter McCluster, 177 (2013)
Most punt returns for touchdown, career: Dante Hall, 5
Most punt returns for touchdown, season: 2 (six players), most recently Tyreek Hill (2016)
Most punt returns for touchdown, rookie season: Dale Carter, 2 (1992)
Highest punt return yard average, career (min. 50 punt returns): Dexter McCluster, 12.1
Highest punt return yard average, season (min. 20 punt returns): Dante Hall, 16.3 (2003)
Highest punt return yard average, rookie season (min.20 punt returns): De'Anthony Thomas, 11.9 (2014)

Miscellaneous

Most games played: Dustin Colquitt, 238
Most games started: Will Shields, 223
Most points: Nick Lowery, 1,466
Most points, season: Priest Holmes, 162 (2003)
Most points, rookie season: Harrison Butker, 116 (2017)
Most points, game: Abner Haynes, 30 (1961); Jamaal Charles, 30 (2013)
Most two-point conversion made: Tony Gonzalez, 3; Travis Kelce, 3
Most two-point conversions made, season: Bo Dickinson, 2 (1961); Travis Kelce, 2 (2015)
Most safeties: Derrick Thomas, 3
Most all-purpose yards, career: Dante Hall, 12,356
Most all-purpose yards, season: Dante Hall, 2,446 (2003)
Most all-purpose yards, rookie season: Abner Haynes, 2,100 (1960)
Most all-purpose yards, game: Stephone Paige, 309 (1985)

Career leaders
All lists are accurate through the 2022 season.

Bold denotes player currently plays for the Chiefs.

Passing leaders

Receiving leaders

Rushing leaders

See also
 List of National Football League records (individual)

References

External links
 2014 Kansas City Chiefs Records

records
Kansas City Chiefs